Jun, or Xun, is a fermented drink similar to kombucha, differing only in that its base ingredients are green tea and honey instead of black tea and cane sugar. Jun is brewed by fermenting green tea (which has been sweetened with honey) with a symbiotic culture of bacteria and yeast (SCOBY). Fruits, sweeteners, spices, and other flavor enhancers are also commonly added to make the taste of the beverage more appealing. Jun is not as popular as kombucha or other similar fermented drinks, so the commercial market for it is much smaller. Because there are not many companies selling it, and the brewing process is rather simple, many consumers of Jun choose to make it themselves. Many health benefits have been credited to Jun and fermented drinks in general, but these are unproven. Any health effects stemming directly from Jun as a whole have not been researched or conclusively substantiated, but some of Jun's main ingredients (honey and green tea) have been shown to individually have positive effects on the human body. Though Jun bears similarities to other fermented drinks like kombucha, water kefir, and kvass, it has enough differences to be considered a distinct drink.

Background

Origin and ingredients
Jun can be thought of as a cousin of kombucha. Jun is composed primarily of green tea and honey, whereas kombucha is made of black tea and cane sugar. The fermentation process also requires a symbiotic colony of bacteria and yeast (SCOBY). Jun has a sweeter taste, higher price, (due to the cost of its ingredients), and limited availability. Although it is still not clear where Jun was initially created, it is claimed by Western vendors to have been developed thousands of years ago by the monks of Bon in Tibet and northern China. American food writer Sandor Katz casts doubt on this claim, however, and believes it to be a modern invention that has been attributed to Tibet as a marketing gimmick: "The lack of credible information on the history of jun leads me to the conclusion that it is a relatively recent divergence from the kombucha family tree. Some websites claim that it comes from Tibet, where it has been made for 1,000 years; unfortunately, books on Tibetan food, and even a specialized book on Himalayan ferments, contain no mention of it." Green tea is unpopular in Tibet; the word "Jun" also does not exist in the Tibetan language, and tea was historically difficult to acquire in Tibet as it was not cultivated in the region.

Ingredient comparison

Green tea vs. Black tea
Both green and black tea are popular around the world, and have historically been associated with health benefits, though this is not currently supported by scientific research. While they differ in color and taste, they both contain antioxidants and caffeine. Green tea has a wider range of antioxidants, many of which have tentatively been shown to reduce the risk of heart disease, but black tea has more caffeine, which is associated with boosting brain function.

Honey vs. sugar
Honey and sugar are both commonly used sweeteners. Both of them are carbohydrates and mainly contain glucose and fructose, which are high in calories and can result in weight gain if overused. The main difference between the two is that, while sugar is composed of 50% glucose and 50% fructose, honey is composed of 30% glucose, 40% fructose, and the remaining 30% consists of water, pollen, and small amounts of vitamins and minerals. Another important difference is that honey is more caloric than sugar, each having 64 calories and 49 calories per tablespoon, respectively.

Fermentation process
The fermentation process for jun typically takes 5–7 days, which is much quicker than most other fermented drinks. Brewing jun technically only requires one step, but is often done in two steps as the additional procedure can add the flavor and carbonation that makes the drink more palatable. Creating jun requires a jar (glass or porcelain are typically used), a SCOBY (symbiotic culture of bacteria and yeast), honey, green tea, and filtered water. Actual measurements will vary depending on the recipe used and personal preference.

Primary fermentation
During the first step of the process, also known as primary fermentation, the living organisms in the SCOBY will consume the honey and give the drink its signature flavor. To brew jun, green tea should be steeped in boiling water for up to 10 minutes. It should then be cooled to room temperature, after which the honey should be added and mixed until it is completely dissolved. After this, the SCOBY should be added to the jar, which should then be covered and left to ferment. Ideal fermentation temperature for jun is between 70-80 degrees Fahrenheit. After five days, the jun should be tasted and assessed for sweetness. If it is too sweet, it should be left to continue fermenting and tasted daily until it reaches the desired level (it can be left to ferment for up to 21 days).

Secondary fermentation
The secondary fermentation is not required, but adds carbonation and additional flavor that many jun drinkers prefer to the unflavored jun brewed in primary fermentation. For this step, the unflavored jun should be bottled in an airtight container with fruits, honey, spices, or any other flavoring agent the brewer wants to add. The closed environment prevents the carbon dioxide created from escaping, resulting in carbonation. The secondary fermentation should be cultured for 1–3 days at room temperature, and then the bottle should be opened and refrigerated until consumed. The longer the secondary fermentation, the more intensely carbonated and flavored the jun will be.

Health claims
Jun's two main ingredients, honey and green tea, are each linked to several health claims. The two main molecules in honey, flavonoids and polyphenols, are antioxidants, which help protect the human body against harmful compounds. Furthermore, evidence suggests that honey serves as an anti-inflammatory, anti-bacterial, and anti-diabetic agent. Green tea comes from the plant Camellia sinesis of the Theacae family and is purported to have anticancer, anti-bacterial, and antiviral effects. Green tea also contains caffeine, which is connected to increased energy levels. Furthermore, green tea has high levels of both theanine and amino acids, which help decrease blood pressure and improve brain and nerve function.

Jun production
Within the United States, there are two main jun producers. Huney Jun is based in Leavenworth, Washington and brews several flavors of jun. This company distributes the drink in local grocery stores as well as on the store website. Wild Tonic, based in Arizona, also brews jun locally, but sells it on larger platforms such as Amazon, Instacart, and Uber Eats. It is also common for jun to be brewed by hand at home as there are many blogs and recipes available on the internet.

Comparisons to similar drinks

Kombucha
Jun and kombucha are very similar in terms of their brewing methods, and purported health benefits. The major difference between the two is their main ingredients. Jun is brewed with green tea and honey, whereas kombucha uses black tea and sugar. Due to the difference in ingredients, though the taste of jun and kombucha resemble each other, jun is typically fizzier and less acidic.

Tibicos/water kefir
Water kefir, also known as tibicos, is fermented with water kefir grains, which are collections of yeast and bacteria, similar to the SCOBY used to brew jun. Water kefir originates from Mexico, and is made not with tea but sweetened water, coconut water, or other natural fruit juices. Like jun it is typically flavored after it is brewed, but is naturally sweeter than jun.

Kvass
Kvass comes from Eastern Europe and is made using fermented bread (typically rye bread). Similar to jun and water kefir, it is typically flavored after it is brewed, often with raisins, tree sap, or caraway seeds. A popular variation of traditional kvass is beet kvass, which is used as a healthier or gluten-free alternative.

References

Chinese tea
Fermented drinks
Food and drink in Tibet
Honey-based beverages